A mobility portfolio is a suite of transportation options accessible with a smartphone. It interfaces with ride-sharing services such as Uber and Lyft, public transportation such as trains and buses, ride sharing and carpooling, bike sharing, and other neighborhood-based networking, focusing on "smarter travel" and "smarter places".

References

Intermodal passenger transport